Alphonse James Schladweiler (July 18, 1902—April 3, 1996) was an American prelate of the Roman Catholic Church. He served as the first bishop of the new Diocese of New Ulm from 1958 to 1975.

Biography

Early life 
Alphonse Schladweiler was born in Milwaukee, Wisconsin, the third child of Mathias and Gertrude (née Schneider) Schladweiler. Following his mother's death in 1911, he and his family moved to Madison, Minnesota. He attended the parochial school of St. Michael's Parish, where he served as an altar boy. He studied at the Franciscan Minor Seminary in Teutopolis, Illinois, for six years before teaching Latin at St. Michael's High School. In 1923, he enrolled at St. Paul Seminary.

Priesthood 
Schladweiler was ordained to the priesthood by Archbishop Austin Dowling on June 9, 1927. After his ordination, Schladweiler served as curate at the following Minnesota parishes:

 Church of the Nativity in St. Paul
 Holy Trinity in New Ulm
 St. Michael's in St. Michael
 St. Bernard's in Cologne. 

He also served as chaplain of St. Mary's Hospital in Minneapolis.

Schladweiler served as pastor at the following parishes:

 St. Joseph's in Montevideo 
 St. Michael's in Morgan 
 Holy Rosary in North Mankato 
 St. Agnes in St. Paul 

In addition to his pastoral duties, he served as prosynodal judge for the Archdiocese of St. Paul from 1954 to 1957. He was raised to the rank of domestic prelate in 1957.

Bishop of New Ulm 
On November 28, 1957, Schaldweiler was appointed the first bishop of the newly erected Diocese of New Ulm by Pope Pius XII. He received his episcopal consecration on January 29, 1958, from Archbishop William O. Brady, with Bishops James Byrne and Hilary Hacker serving as co-consecrators, at the Cathedral of St. Paul. His installation took place at Holy Trinity Church on January 30, 1958.

Between 1962 and 1965, Schaldweiler participated in all four sessions of the Second Vatican Council in Rome. Following the conclusion of the Council, he worked to implement its reforms, including introducing English into the Mass. During his 18-year tenure, he ordained 64 priests and organized St. Isadore Parish in Clarkfield (1960) and Lady of the Lakes Parish in Spicer (1962). In 1972, he founded a diocesan newspaper, Newsletter, and the Diocesan Pastoral Council. He also established a mission in Guatemala, assuming responsibility for staffing a parish in San Lucas Tolimán.

Retirement and legacy 
Pope Paul VI accepted Schaldweiler's resignation as bishop of the Diocese of New Ulm on December 23, 1975. He was succeeded by Bishop Raymond Lucker, an auxiliary bishop of the Archdiocese of St. Paul and Minneapolis.

Schaldweiler later moved to Divine Providence Community Home in Sleepy Eye, Minnesota, where he died on April 3, 1996, at age 93. He is buried in the New Ulm Catholic cemetery.

References

1902 births
Saint Paul Seminary School of Divinity alumni
American people of German descent
20th-century Roman Catholic bishops in the United States
Roman Catholic bishops of New Ulm
Participants in the Second Vatican Council
1996 deaths
Religious leaders from Milwaukee
People from Madison, Minnesota